Syver is a Norwegian male given name. As of June 2020, there are 749 men in Norway with the name Syver. The surname Syversen is a patronymic from Syver.

Notable people
Notable people with this name include:
 Syver Berge (born 1939), Norwegian politician
 Syver Wærsted (born 1996), Norwegian cyclist

References

Norwegian masculine given names